The R312 is a Regional Route in South Africa. Its western origin is north of Durbanville and it heads east to the R44 near Paarl and Wellington.

External links
 Routes Travel Info

References

Regional Routes in the Western Cape